In mathematics, Welch bounds are a family of inequalities pertinent to the problem of evenly spreading a set of unit vectors in a vector space. The bounds are important tools in the design and analysis of certain methods in telecommunication engineering, particularly in coding theory. The bounds were originally published in a 1974 paper by L. R. Welch.

Mathematical statement

Then the following inequalities hold for :Welch bounds are also sometimes stated in terms of the averaged squared overlap between the set of vectors. In this case, one has the inequality

Applicability

In this case,  and the bounds are vacuous. Consequently, interpretation of the bounds is only meaningful if . This will be assumed throughout the remainder of this article.

Proof for k = 1

Its proof proceeds in two steps, each of which depends on a more basic mathematical inequality. The first step invokes the Cauchy–Schwarz inequality and begins by considering the  Gram matrix  of the vectors ; i.e.,

 

 

The square of the Frobenius norm (Hilbert–Schmidt norm) of  satisfies

 

Taking this together with the preceding inequality gives

 

So,

 

or

 

The second part of the proof uses an inequality encompassing the simple observation that the average of a set of non-negative numbers can be no greater than the largest number in the set.
 
So,
 
or 
 

which is precisely the inequality given by Welch in the case that .

Achieving the Welch bounds

In certain telecommunications applications, it is desirable to construct sets of vectors that meet the Welch bounds with equality.  Several techniques have been introduced to obtain so-called Welch Bound Equality (WBE) sets of vectors for the  bound.

The proof given above shows that two separate mathematical inequalities are incorporated into the Welch bound when . The Cauchy–Schwarz inequality is met with equality when the two vectors involved are collinear.

In this case, the vectors are equiangular.

Similarly, the Welch bounds stated in terms of average squared overlap, are saturated for all  if and only if the set of vectors is a -design in the complex projective space .

See also 

 Spherical design
 Quantum t-design
 Equiangular lines

References

Inequalities